refers to one of two mountains in Japan:

Mount Kinka (Gifu), located in Gifu, Gifu Prefecture, formerly known as Mount Inaba
Mount Kinka (Miyagi), located on the island of Kinkasan in Miyagi Prefecture